Senator Parkinson may refer to:

Don Parkinson (politician), Senate of Guam
Mark Parkinson (born 1957), Kansas State Senate
W. J. Parkinson (1844–1902), Washington State Senate